The Head of the Central Propaganda Department of the Communist Party of Vietnam is responsible for leading the propaganda apparat of the Communist Party. Since 2007 every head of the Propaganda Department has been member of the Politburo.

Officeholders

Central Cultural Committee (1949–1950)

Central Propaganda Department (1950–1951)

Education Commission (1950–1951)

Central Propaganda Commission (1951–1989)

Culture and Education Commission (1958–1959)

Central Commission for Science and Education (1968–2007)

Central Commission on Culture (1980–1989)

Central Ideology and Culture Department (1989–2007)

Central Propaganda Department (2007–present)

Notes

References

Bibliography

  
 

Central Committee of the Communist Party of Vietnam
Lists of political office-holders in Vietnam